This is a list of all townlands (over 1600) in the County of Kilkenny. Each column header is a link to an article explaining it. Townlands written in capitals are towns, villages etc. these correspond with xx in the area box. Muni. stands for Municipality (Borough of). This list is separated alphabetically.

A

B

C

D

E

F

G

H

I

J

K

L

M

N

O

P

Q

R

S

T

U

W

V

References

 Searchable database of townlands in Ireland derived from the Index to the 1851 Census of Ireland
 Searchable database of townlands from the OpenStreetMap project

 List
Kilkenny
Kilkenny
Townlands